Yu Wei (born 11 September 1987) is a male Chinese racewalker.

Career
He competed in the 50 kilometres walk event at the 2015 World Championships in Athletics in Beijing, China.

He competed in the 50 kilometres walk event at the 2016 Olympic Summer Games, finishing 5th.

His personal best of 3:42:54 set in Huangshan on 6 March 2016 ranks him #75 of all time.

See also
 China at the 2015 World Championships in Athletics

References

External links

Living people
1987 births
Place of birth missing (living people)
Chinese male racewalkers
World Athletics Championships athletes for China
Athletes (track and field) at the 2016 Summer Olympics
Olympic athletes of China
Universiade medalists in athletics (track and field)
Universiade silver medalists for China
Medalists at the 2011 Summer Universiade